Neomachilis is a genus of jumping bristletails in the family Machilidae. There is one described species in Neomachilis, N. halophila.

References

Further reading

 
 
 
 
 

Archaeognatha
Articles created by Qbugbot
Taxa named by Filippo Silvestri